The Colombian coffee region, also known as the Coffee Triangle is a part of the Paisa region in the rural area of Colombia. It is famous for growing and producing the majority of Colombian coffee. There are four departments in the area: Caldas, Quindío, Risaralda and the north municipalities of Tolima and Valle del Cauca. The most visited cities are Manizales, Armenia, Pereira, and Ibagué.

History of coffee
Coffee was first grown commercially in Colombia in Salazar de las Palmas, north of Santander, and over the twentieth century grew to be Colombia's primary export. When coffee was first brought into the country, the leaders tried to push the farming of coffee beans, but was met with resistance from the people because it takes about 5 years until the first harvest of the bean. In 1999 coffee revenues represented 3.7% of gross domestic product (gdp) and 37% of agricultural employment. The main coffee-producing departments are: Nariño, Norte de Santander, Antioquia, Valle del Cauca, Huila, Tolima, Caldas, Risaralda, Quindio and Cundinamarca.

The area between the departments of Caldas, Risaralda, Quindío and Tolima is known as the Coffee Zone because of the large development experienced by the cultivation of this product. This region was strongly affected by an earthquake that was 6.4 on the Richter scale on January 25, 1999, but subsequently the region's economy recovered rapidly.

Overview 

Weather conditions (8 °C to 24 °C), geographical (Andean Rainforest) and the geological region, determine the production of high quality coffee, with relatively short harvest periods. Farmers in the area have developed techniques for growing, harvesting and processing of grain, and all done "grain by grain", and have retained this form of processing industry despite new techniques of mass agricultural industrialization.

The famous advertising icon "Juan Valdez", represented by a Paisa farmer wearing a carriel, aguadeño hat and poncho, and accompanied by a mule, has become a triumph of advertising communication. Juan Valdez has been considered in United States as the advertising image of greater recall among the inhabitants of that country in the year 2005.

Coffee Cultural Landscape World Heritage Site 

Eighteen urban settlements across six sites within the coffee axis and extending southwards into the Valle del Cauca department were inscribed on the UNESCO World Heritage List in 2011 as the Coffee Cultural Landscape. These sites are representative of the entire coffee axis, preserving multiple different forms of traditional coffee growing, in addition to the culture of the region and the locations of several unique festivals.  The World Heritage site is composed of many of the urban centers within the region, including Armenia, Calarcá, Salamina, Pereira, and Riosucio, as well as smaller towns and the surrounding rural coffee farmlands.

Tourist attractions 

The region has developed major theme parks such as the Colombian National Coffee Park located in the town of Montenegro in Quindio. In the area is also the Museum of Culture Coffee, showing the process from grain production to savoring a traditional Colombian coffee. This museum, like all the other theme parks, are replicas of the colonial city, where tourists enjoy dance performances and traditional music, panoramic views from cable car with its lush landscape, and various rides.

Another unique theme park in Colombia is the National Park of Culture Agriculture - 'Panaca''', also located in the Municipality of Quimbaya in Quindio. Its key feature is that, unlike zoos, visitors are immersed in a personal and direct contact with farm animals and also enjoy scheduled activities and events with those animals.

Other attractions in the area include:Botanical Garden of the University of Pereira as one of the largest in Colombia as the only listed by the BGCI as natural or Sivestre, but also for being one of the orchid s in the world.Santuario is one of the most characteristic towns of the region, is known for its tradition paisa's architecture and streets. It is close to PNN Tatamá.Thermal Santa Rosa de Cabal, a "spa" for bathing in hot springs and different activities for relaxation and body care.Rafting on the Rio la Vieja: Walking the Rio La Vieja on the border between the departments of Valle del Cauca and Quindío, from the town of Quimbaya
 Cocora Valley'' in Salento, home of the national tree Palma wax Quindío one of the most beautiful spots around the axis coffee one of the entry points to Los Nevados National Natural Park where there are also entitled to stay and camp sites.
Quindío Botanical Gardens, located in the town of Calarcá, where you can also see in the butterfly with the largest exhibition of butterflies in the country.

Gastronomy 

Below, in no particular order, are traditional meals, snacks, and drinks from the Coffee Axis:

Bandeja Paisa – lunch 
It is found in almost every restaurant in Colombia, and Colombian national dish, if not a Colombian national icon, is the Bandeja Paisa. Originally from Colombia's Coffee Zone, but now available almost everywhere, Bandeja Paisa is a very large meal. Contains ground beef (sometimes steak), chicharrón (pork belly), chorizo, patacones (plantain pressed into a thick pancake), avocado, arepa (flatbread made with cornmeal), frijoles (beans), and rice.

Mondongo – lunch 
A very filling traditional Colombian soup containing a bit of almost everything. The base is made of diced tripe, to which is added several vegetables such as peas, carrots, onions, potatoes, tomatoes, along with garlic, cilantro, and chicken, beef, and/or pork.

Ajiaco – lunch 
Probably found in almost as many restaurants as Bandeja Paisa, Ajiaco is another very hearty and popular dish in the Coffee Zone of Colombia. A potato and chicken based soup, it is usually accompanied with avocado, corn on the cob, capers, and of course a little sour cream drizzled on top.

Sancocho – lunch 
Another traditional food found in the Eje Cafetero (Coffee Zone of Colombia) is the thick soup of Sancocho. Also very filling, as are many Colombian dishes, the sancocho has many components and is generally made with a base of chicken, beef and / or pork (sometimes all three). From there many ingredients are added such as potato, yucca, plantain, corn, onion, carrot, coriander, cumin, and sometimes cabbage and / or bell peppers are also added. In addition to all these ingredients in the soup, it is also often served with avocado, rice, and hot sauce.

Lechona – lunch / dinner 
Pork is very popular throughout Colombia, and a highly favored dish, especially at large gatherings, is suckling pig. This dish consists of a whole boneless pork roasted and stuffed with rice, peas, onions, garlic, cumin, minced pork and simmered for about 10-12 hours. Generally, it is served with a side of potatoes or an arepa (see below).

Beans – breakfast / lunch / side dish 
A robust dish made with a base of pinto or red beans. Beans are typically cooked with pieces of pork or pork hocks, carrots, corn, plantain, and sometimes bacon as well. Generally, this dish is also served with rice and avocado. It is often used as a complement and is always included in the Bandeja Paisa meal.

Tamales – breakfast / lunch / dinner 
Tamales are found throughout Colombia and with different variations of the same dish within each region. Although the presentation can also vary according to the region, a tamale is always wrapped in banana leaves, and steamed. The basic ingredients that you will find in the tamales of the Colombian Coffee Zone are pork and / or chicken, rice, peas, potatoes and precooked yellow corn flour.

Lentils – lunch 
Lentejas (lentil soup) is a standard food in many Colombian kitchens and is probably one of the simplest to prepare. Although again this dish has variations, the basic method is to soak the lentils for a couple of hours before adding minced onion, garlic, and sometimes chopped or grated carrots. It is then served with avocado, rice, tomato and sweet (yellow) plantain.

Rib soup – breakfast / lunch 
Known throughout Colombia as one of the best hangover cures. Caldo de Costilla (beef rib soup) is often eaten for breakfast and or lunch. It can be served with rice, avocado, plantains. The main ingredients of the Caldo de Costilla are beef ribs, potatoes, carrots and herbs.

Patacones – snack/side dish 
A simple side dish that can accompany almost any meal. Patacones are simply green plantains pressed into a thick pancake and fried. It is often served as a snack with guacamole or tomato sauce at parties or as a starter at a restaurant.

Empanadas – snacks / street food 
Available on almost every street corner and in many restaurants, empanadas are dough, made with a mixture of shredded meat, pork, beef, or chicken. The potatoes are then added and wrapped in a cornmeal batter before frying. It is usually served with one or more hot sauces and often at large family gatherings.

Arepas – appetizers / entrance / street food 
Also available throughout Colombia, an Arepa is a type of flatbread made with cornmeal. It is grilled and served hot with butter and / or cheese. Often used as a side to breakfast with eggs, lunch, or dinner, it's also popular to order a hot chocolate with a cheesy arepa at any time of the day.

Arepas de Choclo – breakfast / snack / street food 
This is basically the luxury in Colombian arepas. Starting with a thick arepa that is buttered and grilled. At this stage, more butter is foamed both on top and inside the arepa before placing a thick chunk of fresh white cheese on top or inside the arepa. It is often served with a hot chocolate or tintico (black coffee) for breakfast or as a snack.

Buñuelos – breakfast / snack / street food 
They are fried balls that are made up of a mixture of corn flour and Colombian white cheese. Popular all year round (especially at Christmas) and generally accompanied by a good cup of Colombian coffee, best served hot and fresh from the deep fryer.

Mazamorra – dessert / drink / side / snack 
La Mazamorra is food or drink. The base of this dish is corn, which is soaked and slowly cooked in water until very soft. During cooking, panela is often drizzled into the liquid. Once chilled, this very refreshing and creamy dish, which includes corn, is ready to serve with added pieces of panela. It is often served with bocadillo (a jelly-like sweet made from guava paste) and extra milk.

Claro – drink 
Claro is a very refreshing cool drink created especially for those who do not want to eat the corn that is included in Mazamorra. Simply remove the corn from the Mazamorra, add a touch of ground panela and thus, Claro is ready.

Main urban centers
Pereira, Risaralda Department
Armenia, Quindío Department
Manizales, Caldas Department
Ibagué, Tolima Department

Tourism
Colombian National Coffee Park Montenegro
Nevado del Ruiz. Manizales
PANACA Parque
Cocora Valley, Salento. Quindío
Matecaña City Zoo

Tourist excursions offer trekking to some of Colombia's top coffee cultivating land as well as the country's native palm tree - the Wax Palm, which grows up to 60 metres tall.

See also
Juan Valdez (International gourmet coffee brand)
Pereira, Risaralda (Colombian City)
Armenia, Quindío (Colombian City)
1999 Armenia earthquake
Manizales, Caldas (Colombian City)
Risaralda (Colombian department)
Quindío (Colombian department)
Caldas (Colombian department)
Ibagué, Tolima Department
Antioquia (Colombian department)
Coffee production in Colombia

Gallery Colombian National Coffee Park

References

External links

 The region's official tourism portal 
 Coffee region travel page on Colombia Reports 
Coffee region blog on Colombia BnB Colombia Tours 
Coffee region blog "Calarca" on Colombia BnB Colombia Tours 
The Colombian Coffee Zone on The Colombian Way 

Coffee production
Agriculture in Colombia